The 2018–19 Southern Miss Lady Eagles basketball team represented the University of Southern Mississippi during the 2018–19 NCAA Division I women's basketball season. The Lady Eagles, led by fifteenth year head coach Joye Lee-McNelis, played their home games at Reed Green Coliseum and were members of Conference USA. They finished the season 18–14, 9–7 in C-USA play to finish in a tie for seventh place. They lost in the first round of the C-USA women's tournament to North Texas. They received an invitation to the WBI where they defeated Nicholls in the first round before losing to North Alabama in the quarterfinals.

Roster

Schedule

|-
!colspan=9 style=| Exhibition

|-
!colspan=9 style=| Non-conference regular season

|-
!colspan=9 style=| Conference USA regular season

|-
!colspan=9 style=| Conference USA Women's Tournament

|-
!colspan=9 style=| WBI

See also
2018–19 Southern Miss Golden Eagles basketball team

References

Southern Miss Lady Eagles basketball seasons
Southern Miss
Southern Miss